(born 17 May 1963) is a Japanese wrestler and Olympic champion in Freestyle wrestling.

Olympics
Kobayashi competed at the 1988 Summer Olympics in Seoul where he received a gold medal in Freestyle wrestling, the light flyweight class.

References

External links
 

1963 births
Living people
Olympic wrestlers of Japan
Wrestlers at the 1988 Summer Olympics
Japanese male sport wrestlers
Olympic gold medalists for Japan
Olympic medalists in wrestling
Asian Games medalists in wrestling
Wrestlers at the 1982 Asian Games
Medalists at the 1988 Summer Olympics
Asian Games gold medalists for Japan
Medalists at the 1982 Asian Games
20th-century Japanese people
21st-century Japanese people